The Workers and Peasants' Bloc was a "Right Opposition" communist group in Spain.

History

BOC was founded in Barcelona in 1931, as the mass front of the Catalan-Balearic Communist Federation (FCCB), after the merger of the Catalan Communist Party into FCCB. FCCB, which made up the nucleus of BOC, later changed its name to Iberian Communist Federation, thus stating its intention to expand itself and BOC throughout Spain. Prominent leaders of BOC were Joaquín Maurín, Hilari Arlandis, Jordi Arquer, Pere Bonet, Víctor Colomer and Abelard Tona Nadalmai. In November 1935, the majority of BOC merged with the Trotskyist Communist Left of Spain, to form the Workers' Party of Marxist Unification (POUM; Catalan: Partit Obrer d'Unificació Marxista). The minority stayed out of the merger and later joined the Unified Socialist Party of Catalonia (PSUC).

Publications
The central publication of BOC was La Batalla. BOC also published L'Hora and El Front in Barcelona, L'Espurna in Girona and Avant in Lleida.

References

Political parties established in 1931
Communist parties in Spain
Political parties disestablished in 1935
POUM
Right Opposition
1931 establishments in Catalonia